James Flanagan is the name of:
James Flanagan (police officer) (1914–1999), Chief Constable of the Royal Ulster Constabulary
James Flanagan (rower) (1884–1937), American rower who won a medal at the 1904 Summer Olympics
James H. Flanagan (1924–2016), founder of the Society of Our Lady of the Most Holy Trinity (SOLT)
James L. Flanagan (1925–2015), engineer and researcher for Rutgers University
James W. Flanagan (1805–1887), U.S. Senator from Texas

See also 

Jim Flanigan (born 1971), American football player
Jim Flanigan Sr. (born 1945), linebacker